Kwast is a surname. Notable people with the surname include:

 James Kwast (1852–1927), Dutch-German pianist 
 Steven L. Kwast, American soldier